Attila (also known as Attila the Hun in the UK) is a 2001 American television miniseries set during the waning days of the Western Roman Empire, in particular during the invasions of the Huns in Europe.

Synopsis
The narrative of the miniseries primarily follows Attila the Hun (reigned 434–453) during his rise to power, violent unification of the Hunnic tribes, and subsequent campaigns, first against the Eastern Roman Empire, and later against the Visigoths and the Western Roman Empire.

A parallel narrative follows Roman general Flavius Aetius, Attila's primary antagonist, who works vigorously to keep the Western Empire intact despite factional politics, a weak emperor, and a steady stream of barbarian invasions.

Cast
Gerard Butler as Attila
Rollo Weeks as Young Attila
Powers Boothe as Flavius Aetius
Simmone Jade Mackinnon as N'Kara / Ildico
Reg Rogers as Valentinian III
Alice Krige as Placidia
Pauline Lynch as Galen
Steven Berkoff as Rua
Andrew Pleavin as Orestes
Tommy Flanagan as Bleda
Kirsty Mitchell as Honoria
Jonathan Hyde as Flavius Felix
Tim Curry as Theodosius II
Janet Henfrey as Palcharia
Liam Cunningham as Theodoric I
Richard Lumsden as Petronius
Mark Letheren as Thorismund
Jolyon Baker as Mundzuk
David Bailie as The Shaman
Isla Fisher as Cerca

Home media
The miniseries was released on DVD November 5, 2002 by Universal.

Historical inaccuracies

Most historians contended that the Huns were of Turco-Mongol descent, as opposed to Caucasian as portrayed here - a small few however have now discounted any connection with the Mongolian Xiongnu and point out that whatever their original point of origin, by Attila's time they had heavily intermarried with western tribes (which had largely been yet to be proven by majority historical accounts). In fact, at least one Hun in the film (Bleda) is made up to look 'mongoloid' - although oddly his uncle (Rua) and brother (Attila) are not.
There is no evidence that Attila ever spent time in Rome, although Aetius was a hostage for a time among the Huns.
The Romans are portrayed in standard Hollywood terms, decadent pagan orgies and all - whereas in reality by this stage they had converted to Christianity.  Aetius does, however, at one point in the series, mention that he and Theodoric are both Christians (and in fact mentions that they had fought over religion, suggesting the historical difference between the Arian Visigoths and the Catholic Romans).
The film depicts the Battle of Châlons as the last major campaign of Attila's career, entirely omitting his campaign the following year in Italy, during which he very nearly sacked Rome but withdrew after meeting with Pope Leo I and Roman officials.
The film depicts Orléans as having fallen to Atilla's advance, when in reality its defenses successfully repelled his assault.
Attila's first wife, N'kara, is entirely fictional as is the daughter of Aetius/Theodoric - although the fact that Attila had adult sons by his death does suggest that he had been married before - perhaps many times. Aetius, however, did have a son named Gaudentius.
The Roman helmets that appear here are the classical Roman helmets, although they had in reality abandoned this armor for the more cost efficient ridge helmet.
The Roman uniforms, shields, and weapons resemble that of the early Roman army instead of the late one.
Both Roman and Hun riders use stirrups, and at times horseshoes, which were not introduced into Europe until several centuries later.
Virtually all the swords shown in the film are much too short - in fact virtually every army in the period used some variant of the spatha or longsword as this gave a much longer reach used from horseback.
The siege engines used by the Huns are clearly trebuchets operated by counterweights which did not reach Europe until centuries after Attila - rather they should have been torsion-powered catapults.
The Roman Emperor Valentinian III is depicted as childish, decadent and idiotic, while in truth he probably was a mature but incompetent ruler.
Galla Placidia and Theodosius II were already dead by the time Valentinian murdered Aetius.
There are no records that back up the notion that Theodoric and Aetius shared the same wife.
As with many films portraying the waning days of the Roman Empire, Rome is still the titular capital city. From the time of Diocletian, emperors spent little time in Rome. Milan was the principal seat of emperors in the West—better situated to respond to emergencies—until 404 when the government was relocated to Ravenna. Valentinian III spent long periods of time in Rome and was resident there when he was assassinated. 
While Theodoric was killed in the battle, the perpetrator was either an anonymous Hun, or possibly Andag, an ambitious fellow Goth. There are no historians who support a Roman conspiracy theory for his death.
Atilla did not kill Bleda immediately after their uncle's death. In fact they were co-rulers for 11 years, before Bleda died under mysterious circumstances. While it is speculated that Atilla did murder his brother, it was certainly not done in a public challenge.
Aetius was never imprisoned by Galla Placidia for his stance against her and Valentianian III,  although he did support Joannes over Galla Placidia's son Valentinian III for ruling of the Western Roman Empire and did fight Galla Placidia's support army from the Eastern Empire of Theodosis II's general Aradaburius.  Aetius was able to negotiate a compromise after the fighting did not resolve a victor.  Aetius was proclaimed magister millitum of Gaul by Galla Placida.

See also
List of historical drama films
List of films set in ancient Rome

References

External links
 

2001 American television series debuts
2001 American television series endings
2000s American television miniseries
Television shows filmed in Lithuania
Television dramas set in ancient Rome
Byzantine Empire in fiction
Television series set in the 5th century
Cultural depictions of Attila the Hun
Valentinian III
Television series set in the Roman Empire
Fratricide in fiction
Cultural depictions of Flavius Aetius